Arthur L. Horwich (born 1951) is an American biologist and Sterling Professor of Genetics and Pediatrics at the Yale School of Medicine. Horwich has also been a Howard Hughes Medical Institute investigator since 1990. His research into protein folding uncovered the action of chaperonins, protein complexes that assist the folding of other proteins; Horwich first published this work in 1989.

For his scientific work Horwich has been awarded the Gairdner International Award (2004), Louisa Gross Horwitz Prize (2008), Lasker Award (2011), Shaw Prize (2012), Albany Medical Center Prize (2016), and Breakthrough Prize (2020). He is a member of the National Academy of Sciences and the American Academy of Arts and Sciences.

Early years 
Horwich was born in 1951. He grew up in Oak Park, west of Chicago. In 1969, he entered Brown University as part of a new program that combined the undergraduate degree with medical school. During medical school, Horwich studied fat cell metabolism in the laboratory of John Fain. Horwich received his A.B. in biomedical sciences in 1972 and his M.D. in 1975. He graduated as valedictorian of the first class to complete the combined program. Horwich went on to do an internship and residency in pediatrics at Yale University. Midway through, Horwich was not sure about an entirely clinical future. After completing his residency, he joined the Salk Institute for Biological Studies in La Jolla, California for a postdoctoral position in molecular biology and virology. At Salk, he worked in Walter Eckhart's laboratory alongside Tony Hunter and witnessed Hunter's discovery of tyrosine phosphorylation. He credits this time with sharpening his skills as a scientist. He said, "Tony taught me the nuts and bolts of thinking about a problem."

Research 
In 1981, Horwich moved back to New Haven, Connecticut for a postdoctoral fellowship at Yale University School of Medicine. He worked in the laboratory of Leon Rosenberg.

In 1984, he moved across the hall from Rosenberg's lab to start his own laboratory as an assistant professor in the department of genetics. He still collaborated with members of the Rosenberg laboratory, including Wayne Fenton. As an independent researcher, Horwich asked whether the pathway that imports an enzyme called ornithine transcarbamylase (OTC) into the mitochondria of mammalian cells also could work in yeast. In 1987, during a genetic screen in yeast, Horwich and his colleagues stumbled across a protein folding function inside mitochondria. In the mutant strain, proteins entered mitochondria from the cytosol normally but then misfolded and aggregated. They named the protein encoded by the affected gene HSP60, Heat shock protein 60, because it has a mass of 60 kDa and is produced in larger quantity in response to heat. Hsp60 is found in an 850 kDa double ring assembly, each ring containing 7 copies of Hsp60. Such assemblies, known as chaperonins, also exist in other cellular compartments and are essential components, mediating protein folding under both heat shock and normal conditions.

Since 1987, Horwich and his colleagues have been studying these molecules both in vivo and in vitro, with particular emphasis on the Hsp60 homologue in E. coli known as GroEL. They and others found early on that a chaperonin-mediated folding reaction can be reconstituted in a test tube, and that has enabled structural and functional studies that have begun to explain how chaperonins work.

Awards and honors 
 2003: Elected to the National Academy of Sciences. 
 2004: Canada Gairdner International Award, awarded for "fundamental discoveries concerning chaperone assisted protein folding in the cell and its relevance to neurodegeneration". 
 2007: Wiley Prize, awarded jointly with Franz-Ulrich Hartl "for their significant contribution in the understanding of protein folding." 
 2008: Rosenstiel Award, awarded jointly with Hartl "for their pioneering work in the field of protein-mediated protein folding." 
 2008: Louisa Gross Horwitz Prize for Biology or Biochemistry, Columbia University; awarded jointly with Hartl
 2008: Elected to the National Academy of Medicine
 2011: Massry Prize, Keck School of Medicine, University of Southern California
 2011: Albert Lasker Award for Basic Medical Research, awarded jointly with Hartl "for discoveries concerning the cell's protein-folding machinery, exemplified by cage-like structures that convert newly made proteins into their biologically active forms."
 2012: Shaw Prize, awarded jointly with Hartl
 2014: Honorary Doctorate of Medical Science, Brown University.
 2016: Albany Medical Center Prize
 2019: Paul Ehrlich and Ludwig Darmstaedter Prize
 2019: Dr. Paul Janssen Award for Biomedical Research, awarded jointly with Hartl "for their revolutionary insights into the fundamental molecular process of protein folding"
 2020: Breakthrough Prize in Life Sciences, "for discovering functions of molecular chaperones in mediating protein folding and preventing protein aggregation."
 2021: Elected to the American Academy of Arts and Sciences
 2021: 2022 Human Frontier Science Program Nakasone Award

He has also received two Protein Society awards – the Hans Neurath Award in 2001 and the Stein and Moore Award in 2006.

References

External links 
 Art Horwich Lab at Yale
 Interview with Arthur Horwich
 Chaperonin-Mediated Protein Folding
Arthur Horwich Seminars: "Chaperone-Assisted Protein Folding"

1951 births
Members of the United States National Academy of Sciences
Brown University alumni
Howard Hughes Medical Investigators
Yale School of Medicine faculty
Yale University faculty
Living people
Recipients of the Albert Lasker Award for Basic Medical Research
Yale Sterling Professors
Massry Prize recipients
Alpert Medical School alumni
21st-century American biologists
Members of the National Academy of Medicine